The Baton Rouge Rugby Football Club (also known as BRRFC), founded in 1977, is a men's rugby union team based in Baton Rouge, Louisiana, United States. The club competes in and is governed by the True South and USA Rugby.

History

Founded in 1977, the club has been a cornerstone of the rugby community boasting healthy numbers and excellent play.  Being in Louisiana provided the club distinct advantages with food and culture in the southern region - rugby has been an excellent addition to the Baton Rouge Area.  BR RFC has attracted diverse players over the years boasting Men who have worked in Oil/Chemical, Engineers, Lawyers, Doctors, Nurses, Beer Distributors, Semi-Pro Athletes just to name a few.

Many players are from the surrounding areas: Lafayette, Mandeville, Hammond and New Orleans but also international invites have had players from Britain, Australia, New Zealand and Fiji.

Up until 1991, Baton Rouge played as a Division I Rugby Team, where they secured many national invites, namely the 1985 National Championship game vs Philadelphia Whitemarsh.  The club has had a myriad of success throughout the years even after transitioning to Division II rugby in 1992.  The Club participates in many local Baton Rouge Charities; most notably Toys for Tots, the BR Women's Shelter, Youth Rugby and the Red Cross.

Notable Matches and Accomplishments 
 1979: ERU National Championship Game
 1980, 1982, 1984: Regional Finals Qualifier
 1985: ERU National Championship Game 
 1993: ERU National Championship Runner-up
 1994: ERU National Championship Runner-up
 2013: True South Rugby - West Champions
 2014: True South Rugby - West Champions

Founding Members 
Founding members include:  Hookers, Phil Siccone and Tyrone Yokum; props, Jim Brugh, Reggie Davis, Steve Hazel, and Bob ‘Santa’ Lundsford; locks, Bob Causey and Tom Gagneaux; loose forwards, Barry Haney, Rob Wright, Gary Meyers, and Wayne Fontanelle; No. 8, Mark Lawson and Rick Odom; back, Frank Perkins, Johnny Mclean, Clay Mahaffey, Paul Lachin, Phil Lachin, Bob Dow, Les Bratton, Bill Bratton, Donnie Bratton, and the Hammond connection; Bob Tuminello, Gene Hampton, Bobby Guidera, and Jim Morris.

Tournaments 
Baton Rouge Rugby puts on two tournaments every year - The Redfish Sevens Tournament and the Ho-Ho-Ho Tournament for Charity.

Redfish Sevens 
The Redfish Tournament is a Rugby Sevens round-robin game.  All clubs of any age group, male and female may participate.  The tournament usually boasts 25-40 teams every year for the sevens non-qualifier sometime between June and July.

Ho-Ho-Ho Tournament 
The Ho-Ho-Ho Tournament is a co-ed scrimmage that occurs every year in December to raise money for Toy-for-Tots, the BR RFC's target charity work every year.  In 2016, the club donated 200+ Toys and $400 to the local area Toys for Tots at Happy's Bar.  The Scrimmage is unique as players dress up in santa themed outfits and play a toned-down game of rugby so injuries can be avoided.  Players come from around the state of Louisiana to participate as ages 17+ are welcome.

Rugby Union Memberships 
The Baton Rouge Rugby Football Club was originally a member of Deep South Rugby Football Union.

In the late 1990s, the club moved to the Texas Geographical Union where they competed against other TGU Division 1/2 teams such as: Dallas, Austin, Houston, San Antonio and Shreveport.  Baton Rouge later returned to the Deep South Rugby Union in 2009, converting back to a Division 2 squad.

In 2013, the Deep South Rugby Union became a subdivision of the True South Geographical Union, later becoming True South Rugby where Baton Rouge currently competes against its main rivals:
 Birmingham RFC
 Jackson RFC
 Memphis RFC

Practice/Field Location
Currently, BR RFC practices and plays at Highland Road Park located in Baton Rouge, LA

See also
True South
USA Rugby
Rugby union in the United States

References

External links
Official site
USA Rugby
IRB Official Site

American rugby union teams
Rugby union teams in Louisiana
Sports teams in Baton Rouge, Louisiana
Rugby clubs established in 1977